Guncati is a suburban settlement of Belgrade, Serbia. It is located in the municipality of Barajevo. According to the 2011 census, the village has a population of 2,752 people.

Guncati is located west of the municipal seat of Barajevo, halfway between the Belgrade–Bar railway and the Ibar Highway.

It is a rural settlement with a steady population growth: from 1,718 (Census 1991) to 2,752 (Census 2011).

References

Suburbs of Belgrade
Barajevo